Rear Admiral Philip Daly Gallery (October 17, 1907 – November 29, 1973) was a United States Navy officer who served with distinction on destroyers in the Pacific Theater during World War II, rising to the rank of rear admiral.

Philip Gallery was the son of Daniel Vincent Gallery (born Chicago, July 19, 1865), lawyer, and Mary Onahan Gallery, writer. He graduated from the United States Naval Academy.

During World War II, he was in command of the destroyer , earning the Legion of Merit and two Bronze Stars for his service.

After World War II, his commands included Destroyer Division 72, the fleet replenishment oiler , and the heavy cruiser .

He retired from the navy in 1958.  He died in 1973 and was buried with full military honors in Arlington National Cemetery.

Two of his brothers, William O. Gallery and Daniel V. Gallery, also became rear admirals.  The  is named in honor of the three Admirals Gallery.

Decorations

See also
William O. Gallery
Daniel V. Gallery

References

1907 births
1973 deaths
United States Navy personnel of World War II
Burials at Arlington National Cemetery
United States Naval Academy alumni
United States Navy rear admirals
Recipients of the Legion of Merit